The term "bin bug" was coined in August 2006 by the British media to refer to the use of Radio Frequency Identification (RFID) chips by some local councils to monitor the amount of domestic waste created by each household. The system works by having a unique RFID chip for each household's non-recycling wheelie bin (such households have two bins: one for general waste and one recycling bin).  The chip is scanned by the dustbin lorry and, as it lifts the bin, records the weight of the contents.  This is then stored in a central database that monitors the non-recycled waste output of each household.

History in England
If the pilot schemes are successful it is expected that most British cities will introduce the system in the next two years.  Three local councils in England and five Ulster councils have been trialling the scheme.
While some councils informed the householders of their intentions to monitor their waste output many others did not.  Worcester City Council, for example, detailed their plans through local newspaper Worcester News in August 2005.  Aberdeen City Council kept the scheme quiet until a local newspaper ran the story; the council declared no intention to operate or bring the system online but did not rule out future use.
Some councillors said that the purpose of the "bin bugs" was to settle disputes about the ownership of the bins, but others mentioned that the system is a trial and means that they are more prepared should the government introduce a household waste tax.  The tax would be in the form of a charge for households that exceed set limits of non-recycled waste.  With recycling in the UK amongst the lowest percentage in Europe at 18%, a new tax scheme would have the intention of encouraging domestic recycling and meeting European landfill reduction targets.

Each RFID chip costs around £2, with each scanning system costing around £15,000.  The Local Government Association (LGA) provided £5 million to councils to fund 40 pilot schemes.  They are supplied by two rival German companies: Sulo and Deister Electronic.  Some suggest that people who removed the chip might not have their bin emptied.

European Directives
The motivation behind the RFID chips are to monitor the production of landfill waste so that councils can comply with the European Landfill Directive 1999/31/EC. ""
The standard regulating RFID tags for the waste industry is EN 14803 Identification and/or determination of the quantity of waste.

Removing the bug
The RFID tag is located in a recess under the front lip of the bin, either as a self-contained unit or behind a plastic cap.

There is some debate as to the legality of removing the RFID chip.

References

Waste collection
Radio-frequency identification
Surveillance